Þorsteinn Þorsteinsson may refer to:

 Þorsteinn Þorsteinsson (1880–1979), Icelandic economist and Esperantist
 Þorsteinn Þorsteinsson (athlete) (born 1947), Icelandic athlete who competed in the 800 metres
 Þorsteinn Þorsteinsson (footballer) (born 1964), Icelandic footballer